Four bantamweight boxers participated in The Bantamweight Tournament: Winner Takes All, one of the bouts being Yonnhy Perez vs. Joseph Agbeko II. The tournament itself was a two-stage, single-elimination tournament of 118-pounders – which began with two semifinal bouts on Saturday, Dec. 11, 2010, in the Battle at the Boat series from the Emerald Queen Casino in Tacoma, Wash.

In the opening bout, undefeated, world-ranked rising star Abner Mares of Guadalajara Jalisco, Mexico, faced two-division world champion Vic Darchinyan of Sydney, Australia, by way of Armenia. 

In the main event, Perez and Agbeko squared off against each other for the second time. They had fought a Fight of the Year candidate the previous October.

Build up 
Rather than an immediate rematch with Perez and Mares, Perez faced Joseph Agbeko for the second time in the first round for his IBF, which he won from him, in Showtime's upcoming bantamweight tournament while Mares faces Vic Darchinyan. The winners of both fights will face each other sometime in early 2011.

They are barely unknown outside of boxing circles, fighting in a 118-pound division that rarely gets any attention. But they've all signed on for a single-elimination tournament in hopes of not only making a name for themselves, but also providing boxing fans with some exciting fights.
The tournament originally was scheduled for Leon, Mexico, but Showtime did a site survey and realized that the cost for staging the event there - including security in a region that has been besieged by violence among the drug cartels - would be prohibitive. When no venue could be secured in Los Angeles, the event was moved to Tacoma, Wash.
Perez was the only current champion, (Vic Darchinyan  was the IBO champion, but that organization lacks real recognition by the International Boxing Hall of Fame, other organizations, boxing magazines and fans)  while Agbeko had held world titles and Mares was a top contender. They had a combined record of 102-4-3 with 76 knockouts before these two bouts.

Undercard

Televised
Bantamweight bout:  Yohnny Perez (c) vs.  Joseph Agbeko
Agbeko defeats Perez via unanimous decision.
Bantamweight bout:  Vic Darchinyan (c) vs.  Abner Mares
Mares defeats Darchinyan via     split decision.
Super Flyweight bout:  Cesar Seda vs.  Ernie Marquez
Seda defeats Marquez via TKO in round 1.
Super Bantamweight bout:  Chris Avalos vs.  Cecilio Santos
Avalos defeats Santos via RTD at 0:01 of round 4.

External links

References

Boxing matches
2010 in boxing
Boxing in Washington (state)
2010 in sports in Washington (state)
Golden Boy Promotions
December 2010 sports events in the United States